Max Havoc: Ring of Fire is a 2006 action film directed by Terry Ingram. Mickey Hardt reprises his role from the 2004 film Max Havoc: Curse of the Dragon as ex-kickboxing champion and photographer Max Havoc.

Plot
Retired kickboxing champion Max Havoc still works as a sports photographer for a magazine. Max shall take photographs of Suzy Blaine, a tennis celebrity. But when he arrives at a hotel in the outskirts of Seattle, a little boy named Emile steals the suitcase which contains his costly camera and further equipment. During his escape the young thief loses a piece of his clothing with a label that points to a very old mission in a no-go area.

Sister Caroline informs Max about a street gang that systematically frightens off old-established shopkeepers. As Max learns Emile once started stealing because his parents (also shopkeepers) had been killed as a result of arson. While Max is still present, the street gang appears and threatens Sister Caroline because she is reluctant to pay protection money. Max fights against the gangsters but spares a member named Ramon for he is Emile's big brother.

The next day Emile witnesses how his brother Ramon is executed for alleged cowardice. Roger Tarso, the owner of the hotel where Max and Suzy and her mother currently stay, has decided to clear the slums by all means because he wants to add the land to his premises. In order to keep all this a secret he has Emile chased by his henchmen. But Max and Suzy discover his scheme anyway and try to find Emile first. In the end Max has to fight against an enemy who seems to know his fighting style better than Max himself.

Cast
Mickey Hardt as Max Havoc
Christina Cox as Suzy Blaine
Linda Thorson as Denise Blaine
Dean Cain as Roger Tarso
Rae Dawn Chong as Sister Caroline
Samuel Patrick Chu as Emile
Martin Kove as Lt. Reynolds

Reception
Reviewer for Direct to Video Connoisseur was not impressed by this film's dialogues or its storyline but it was recommended for movie fans who enjoy martial arts. Albert Valentin of Kung Fu Cinema praised fight choreography by Steve McMichael and Mickey Hardt's kickboxing and Muay Thai prowess, but complained about too little lighting during action scenes.

References

External links
 
 
 

2006 films
Canadian action films
English-language Canadian films
2006 martial arts films
2006 action films
2000s English-language films
2000s Canadian films